Bald Hill, or Baldhill, is a community in Okmulgee County, Oklahoma.  It is located about 15 miles northeast of the City of Okmulgee, the county seat, off of Oklahoma State Highway 16.  A post office was established here in 1896, but was closed in 1908.  Nevertheless, the town was fueled by oil money, and had a population of 150 in 1923.

Bald Hill was the location of a mansion on a high hill belonging to Enos Wilson.  Wilson was recognized in 1935 by the Superintendent of the Five Civilized Tribes as then being the “world’s richest Indian.”  A paper referred to the mansion as “his famous peak castle.” 

Bald Hill is now considered a ghost town.

References 

Unincorporated communities in Okmulgee County, Oklahoma